Papillifera papillaris, also known as Papillifera bidens, is a species of small, air-breathing land snail with a clausilium, a terrestrial pulmonate gastropod mollusk in the family Clausiliidae, the door snails. This is a Mediterranean species.

In Britain this species is now sometimes called the "Cliveden snail", as in 2004 a very small colony was found to have been living on the estate at Cliveden House, a large stately home in Buckinghamshire, England. Individuals of the species had been living on an Italian balustrade which was imported to Britain in the late 19th century, and have survived at the estate for over a century before they were discovered there. Other introduced populations of P. papillaris can be found across South East England.

There is a complicated nomenclatural problem with the name of this species. Some argued that the name should be Papillifera bidens. See further discussion under "Nomenclature".

Nomenclature 
The ICZN opinion, number 2176, preserved the name Turbo bidens Linnaeus, 1758, and indicated implicitly that the name Helix papillaris Müller, 1774 was a junior synonym of the same species. However, at this time the meaning of the name Turbo bidens was not fixed with a valid type specimen designation. In 2009 Kadolsky  reviewed the nomenclatural history of the name Turbo bidens and concluded that a neotype designation proposed by Falkner et al. (2002) was invalid because it was not based on an existing specimen but on a figure of Papillifera papillaris published by Gualtierus (1742), which did not agree with Linnaeus' description of Turbo bidens, and which Linnaeus did not quote.

Kadolsky (2009) argued that Linnaeus' brief description was consistent with a figure in Gualtierius' (1742) work that Linnaeus (1758) quoted, and so Kadolsky fixed the meaning of the nominal species Turbo bidens Linnaeus, 1758 with the designation of a neotype. This neotype is a specimen from Florence (where Gualtierius lived and where he might conceivably have collected) of the clausiliid species hitherto known as Cochlodina incisa (Küster, 1876). However, the malacologist Hartmut Nordsieck and others did not accept Kadolsky's interpretation.

One reason for this opinion was Linnaeus' description of the shell suture of Turbo bidens as "subcrenata". This does not apply to Cochlodina incisa, except for minute crenellations which hardly deserve the name, but Gualtierius' figure does actually show these crenellations. Kadolsky argued that Linnaeus accepted the figure as correct and described his species accordingly. Nordsieck and others instead argued that Linnaeus accidentally referred to the wrong figure, but that his verbal description was an accurate description of the Papillifera species.

Kadolsky's neotype designation for Turbo bidens claims to fix the meaning of this name conclusively. In this case the valid name for the Papillifera species would be Papillifera papillaris (Müller, 1774). Others did not accept that the designation of a neotype was valid, in which case the correct name is Papillifera bidens (Linnaeus, 1758).

The issue was raised with the ICZN and their ruling (Opinion 2355) was not to set aside Kadolsky's neotype; hence the name to use is Papillifera papillaris (Müller, 1774).

Subspecies
 Papillifera papillaris affinis (Philippi, 1836)
 Papillifera papillaris circinata (Paulucci, 1878)
 Papillifera papillaris papillaris (O. F. Müller, 1774)
 Papillifera papillaris peculiaris (Monterosato, 1892)
 Papillifera papillaris rudicosta (O. Boettger, 1878)
 Papillifera papillaris tinei (Westerlund, 1878)
 Papillifera papillaris transitans (Paulucci, 1878)

Shell description

The shells of Papillifera papillaris are coiled sinistrally and, like other clausilids, extremely high-spired, with 10–11 whorls.

The width of the shell is 3.2–3.8 mm, and the height of the shell is 12–15 mm.

The genus name Papillifera means "bearing papules", in other words having pimples, a reference to the small white shell structures along the suture line. The papules are very noticeable.

Habitat 
In most of its range, this species lives in rocky limestone habitats, and can often be found near the seashore.

Distribution

The native range of this species is Mediterranean; it is originally native only to Italy, Sardinia, Corsica, and Sicily.

This species has been introduced and has become established throughout the Mediterranean region, including 
Malta, Spain (Catalonia and Balearic Islands), Gibraltar, the south coast of France, Great Britain, Croatia (Susak), Montenegro, Albania, Greece, Turkey (since 330 AD or before), Libya, Tunisia, Algeria  and Morocco.  At least some of these introductions appear to have been accidental, on imported stonework, and may in some cases date back to the Roman occupation of these areas. But the process is continuing: in 2009–2010, Papillifera papillaris imported on Italian limestone blocks were found to have survived overwinter in a stonemason's yard near Stuttgart, Germany.

In Great Britain

This snail was also accidentally introduced to southern England, more than once, and became established there.

In 2004, the species was found in Buckinghamshire, southeastern England, in the crevices of a travertine marble and brick balustrade. This balustrade was originally constructed in Italy in about 1816, and had stood in the grounds of the Villa Borghese, in Rome. In the late 19th century the balustrade was taken from there, and was installed in the formal gardens of the country house Cliveden in 1896. These small snails shelter in the many nooks and crannies of the travertine marble stonework; presumably they feed on lichens that grow on the surfaces of the stone.

The snails at Cliveden were noticed by a specialist volunteer who was cleaning the stonework and statuary; the identity of the snail was recognized by Janet Ridout-Sharpe. The snails have spread from the balustrade to a red brick terrace and a stone fountain, but apparently no further than that. Although this is certainly an introduced species, it is not an invasive species.

Subsequent to the publicity surrounding this find, it was pointed out that the same species had already been recorded in 1993 from Brownsea Island, Dorset in southwest England. At Brownsea Island, as at Cliveden, the snails live on stonework and statuary imported from Italy a century or more earlier. There are even indications of a Dorset occurrence of this snail, perhaps from the Brownsea Island locality, 250 years earlier.

References

External links
 Paul Eccleston. 21 August 2008. Italian immigrant snail was hiding in marble balustrade for 100 years. https://www.telegraph.co.uk/
 Snails pace discovery reveals amazing find. The National Trust website. (archived December 2011)
 Richard Black. 21 August 2008. Snail hides from march of history. BBC News website.

Clausiliidae
Gastropods described in 1774
Taxa named by Otto Friedrich Müller